Karol Beck and Michal Mertiňák  were the defending champions, but they did not participate this year.

Martin Emmrich and Andreas Siljeström won the title, defeating Błażej Koniusz and Mateusz Kowalczyk in the final, 6–4, 7–5.

Seeds

Draw

References
 Main Draw

Trofeo Faip-Perrel - Doubles